Sandahl is a Swedish surname. Notable people with the surname include:

Gösta Sandahl, Swedish figure skater, 1912 European Champion and 1914 World Champion
Ingrid Sandahl, Swedish gymnast and Olympic champion
Jette Sandahl, Danish curator and museum director
Olle Sandahl, Swedish Christian Democratic politician and member of the Riksdag

Given name 
Sandahl Bergman, American dancer, stuntwoman, and actress

Swedish-language surnames